State Electricity Commission can refer to:

 State Electricity Commission of Victoria, Australia
 State Electricity Commission of Western Australia
 State Electricity Commission of Queensland

See also
 Electricity Commission of New South Wales